Diuris exitela, commonly called the Mount Moffat doubletail, is a species of orchid which is endemic to central western Queensland. It has two linear leaves at its base, up to twelve bright yellow flowers with dark brown markings and grows on sandstone cliffs and ridges.

Description
Flowering occurs in September and October.

Taxonomy and naming
Diuris exitela was first formally described in 1991 by David Jones from a specimen collected on Mount Moffat and the description was published in Australian Orchid Research. The specific epithet (exitela) is derived from the Ancient Greek word exitelos meaning "lessening", "fading" or "weakening", referring to the colour of the flowers which fades quickly from bright yellow to pale yellow as they age.

Distribution and habitat
The Mount Moffat doubletail grows mainly on sandstone cliffs and ridges but also between sandstone boulders in woodland and is found on Mount Moffat and in Carnarvon Gorge in central western Queensland.

References

exitela
Endemic orchids of Australia
Orchids of Queensland
Plants described in 1991